The Yunyang Yangtze River Bridge is an asymmetric cable-stayed bridge across the Yangtze River in Yunyang County, Chongqing, China. Completed in 2005, the bridge has a total length of  including approaches on either bank. The asymmetric design of the bridge is different from most cable-stayed bridges. The southern tower is  higher than the northern tower.

See also
Yangtze River bridges and tunnels

References

Bridges in Chongqing
Bridges over the Yangtze River
Cable-stayed bridges in China
Bridges completed in 2005